The Thermodesulfobacteriaceae are a family of sulfate-reducing bacteria.

Phylogeny

Taxonomy
The currently accepted taxonomy is based on the List of Prokaryotic names with Standing in Nomenclature (LPSN) and National Center for Biotechnology Information (NCBI)

 Class Thermodesulfobacteria Hatchikian, Ollivier & Garcia 2002
 Order Thermodesulfobacteriales Hatchikian, Ollivier & Garcia 2002
 Genus "Geothermobacterium" Kashefi et al. 2002
 Genus Thermosulfuriphilus Slobodkin et al. 2012
 Family Thermodesulfatatoraceae Waite et al. 2020
 Genus Thermodesulfatator Moussard et al. 2004
 Family Thermodesulfobacteriaceae Hatchikian, Ollivier & Garcia 2002
 Genus Caldimicrobium Miroshnichenko et al. 2009
 Genus Thermodesulfobacterium Zeikus et al. 1995
 Genus Thermosulfurimonas Slobodkin et al. 2012

See also 
 List of bacterial orders
 List of bacteria genera

References

 
Bergey's volume 1
Bacteria classes